Lithuanian National Radio and Television (Lithuanian: Lietuvos nacionalinis radijas ir televizija) is a non-profit news network that has been providing regular radio services since 1926 and television broadcasts since 1957. LRT joined the European Broadcasting Union in 1993. LRT operates three national television channels, radio stations and an internet website.

LRT is the largest media group in Lithuania and is publicly owned. Therefore, its fundamental mission is to serve the public interest and the public’s right to trustworthy and objective information. Radio and television services are now operating from LRT headquarters in Vilnius. LRT radijas, the main LRT radio station, has the biggest share in Lithuanian radio market and pays most of attention to the operative news and educative on-air production.

History
The Lithuanian Radio started regular broadcasting on 12 June 1926. The television service has been broadcasting since 30 April 1957. In 1965, radio broadcasts were started in English. In 1975, the first coloured programme from LRT was broadcast. Radio and television services are now operating from LRT headquarters in Vilnius, the capital of Lithuania. At the end of 2019, LRT employed approx. 600 people.
In May 2007 LRT started a project of converting all of its films, including some five thousand hours of cinefilm and some 30,000 hours of videotapes to digital. The oldest entry dates back to 1895.

LRT comprises seven media channels broadcasting nation-wide. The content of all the channels is integrated and shared across all three platforms: television, radio, and on-line (web-portal and LRT's accounts on social media networks). LRT produces around two-thirds of its content in-house, while one third is commissioned from external producers.

In delivering international news coverage, LRT cooperates with private and public media, including Deutsche Welle, Voice of America, Radio Free Europe/Radio Liberty, and others. LRT was admitted as a fully active member of the European Broadcasting Union on 1 January 1993. From the restoration of independence in 1991 to 31 December 1992, LRT was a member of the International Radio and Television Organisation.

Governance
The LRT Council is the highest governing institution of LRT. The Council supervises the implementation of the LRT mission, approves the annual income and spending by LRT administration. The Council comprises twelve members prominent in social, scientific and cultural fields, appointed for six-year terms.

On financial issues, the LRT Council and the management are being consulted by the  LRT Administrative Commission. The Administrative Commission is made up of five members – management and (or) finance specialists – who are appointed by the Council for a term of four years. Currently, the LRT Council is chaired by Liudvikas Gadeikis.

Budget

LRT operations are funded by taxpayers. LRT budget depends directly on taxes collected in the year before the last. The state allocates 1.5 percent of the personal income tax and 1.3 percent of the collected excise duties. 
The LRT's budget for 2019 stood at 41.65 million euros. Budget project for 2020 envisages allocating 46.30 million euros for LRT.

Between 1992 and 2015 LRT had received income from advertising.

Facilities and equipment

LRT has TV studios of 70 sq.m, 120 sq.m, two studios of 300 sq.m and one studio of 700 sq.m. LRT also uses OB stations for broadcasting. Studio facilities include modern computer graphics equipment.

Platforms and channels
LRT TV and live radio broadcasts are accessible globally on LRT.lt (except for foreign content which is restricted by authors' rights in other countries).

Radio
 LRT Radijas – main generalist radio programme;
 LRT Klasika – culture content and classical music as well as specialised content for Lithuanian ethnic minority groups;
 LRT Opus –  contemporary music and content for younger audiences.

Television
 LRT Televizija (HD) – broadcasts generalist programming in HD which is aimed at a wide audience;
 LRT Plius (HD) – focuses on culture and sports;
 LRT Lituanica – broadcasts exclusively Lithuanian content of two other LRT TV channels around the clock via the satellite and internet webpage and is also streamed live on YouTube.

Online
 LRT.lt – in addition to the main news page in the Lithuanian language, it also has news in English and Russian. All content which has been published or aired on LRT channels is permanently stored and freely accessible at LRT's digital archive Mediateka.

Logo

See also
1991 January Events (Lithuania)

References

External links

 

Television in Lithuania
Publicly funded broadcasters
Television channels and stations established in 1957
European Broadcasting Union members
Mass media companies of Lithuania
1926 establishments in Lithuania